HMS Kinross was a  of the Royal Navy. Kinross was a member of the Admiralty's modified design of Hunt-class minesweepers, which are known variously as the Aberdare class or Aberdare group.

Loss
At the time of her loss HMS Kinross' was serving with the Mediterranean Fast Minesweeper Flotilla.

Casualties

12 members of the ships company were lost, with most casualties incurred in the ships engine & boiler rooms.

References

 

 

Hunt-class minesweepers (1916)
Royal Navy ship names
1918 ships
Ships built on the River Clyde
1918 in Scotland
Maritime incidents in 1919
Ships sunk by mines
Shipwrecks in the Aegean Sea

fi:HMS Aberdare